The Parnitha Olympic Mountain Bike Venue was the site of the mountain biking events at the 2004 Summer Olympics at Athens, Greece. The venue is located at Parnitha, a mountain located in Acharnai, Athens.

References

Mountain biking venues
Venues of the 2004 Summer Olympics
Olympic cycling venues